Preston St Mary is a village and civil parish in Suffolk, England. Located to the north-east of Lavenham, it is part of the Babergh district. The parish includes the hamlets of Rooksey Green and Whelp Street.

The church of St Mary dates from the 14th and 15th centuries but was rebuilt in 1868 after being struck by lightning in 1758. It is a grade I listed building.

Preston Hall is a 17th-century grade II* listed country house.

An episode of Time Team was filmed in the village in 1996.

References

External links
Village website
Preston St Mary Vision of Britain
St Mary's Church Suffolk Churches
Preston St Mary 1830-1850 (Password: StMary)

Villages in Suffolk
Babergh District
Civil parishes in Suffolk